The Kuwaiti Division I Basketball League is the highest professional basketball league in Kuwait. The most decorated team in the league is Kuwait SC, who have won 7 titles.

Teams
Al Kuwait SC
Al Arabi
Al Jahraa
Al Nasar
Al Qadsia
Al Sahel
Al Salmiyah
Al Shabab
Al Sulaibikhat
Al Tadhamon
Al Yarmook
Kazma

Champions 
The following teams have won the Division 1 championship:

 2004: Kuwait SC
 2012: Kazma
 2013: Kuwait SC
 2014: Kuwait SC
 2015: Kuwait SC
 2016: Qadsia
 2017: Kuwait SC
 2020: Kuwait SC
 2021: Kuwait SC
 2022: Kuwait SC

Finals and final standings

References

External links
AsiaBasket.com League Page

League
Basketball
Basketball leagues in Asia